Gianni Romano (August 21, 1931 in Basiliano, Province of Udine – August 24, 2010 in Udine) was an Italian professional football player.

Honours
 Serie A champion: 1960/61.

Notes

1931 births
2010 deaths
People from Basiliano
Italian footballers
Serie A players
Udinese Calcio players
Venezia F.C. players
Juventus F.C. players
Association football goalkeepers
Footballers from Friuli Venezia Giulia